Calair refers to:
 Calair (airline), German charter airline (1970–1972) 

Cəlayir may refer to:
Cəlayir, Agsu, Azerbaijan
Cəlayir, Jalilabad, Azerbaijan
Cəlayir, Qakh, Azerbaijan